The Happiness Waltz is the 10th studio album by American singer-songwriter Josh Rouse, released on March 19, 2013 on Yep Roc Records.

Track listing

Weekly charts

References

2013 albums
Josh Rouse albums
Yep Roc Records albums